The Rewind 80s Festival Australia was a music festival due to take place at Hordern Pavilion, Moore Park, Sydney, New South Wales, Australia. The festival was a planned expansion of the very successful Rewind Festival that is held in England, to have been held for the first time in Australia between 29 and 30 October 2011.

The festival was to showcase bands and solo artists that had success in the 1980s thus giving its name. The festival was managed by Evolution Worldwide Ltd.

Rewind 80s Festival Australia 2011 

The initial edition would have taken place on 29 & 30 October 2011. The venue, Hordern Pavilion, is currently licensed to hold 6000 people. Therefore, the maximum possible attendance for the festival would have been 12,000 people.

Saturday and Sunday concert lineup 
Acts that were announced include Ross Wilson, Bananarama, Midge Ure and Right Said Fred. The second round of headline announcements was made live on The Morning Show on the Seven/Prime TV Network on Monday 5 September 2011. Some overseas acts including The Human League were cancelled on 12 October 2011, as the organisers reportedly hadn't applied for work visas for the acts. On 15 October, Bananarama announced that they wouldn't be performing.

On 17 October 2011, the organisers announced that the festival had been cancelled.

Kajagoogoo was also announced on The Morning Show on Monday 5 September 2011 but Rewind 80's Festival Australia organisers were unable to confirm the date of their performance. On the Rewind 80s Festival Australia 2011 official Facebook Page, they did not announce Kajagoogoo.

2011 venue relocation controversy

On 12 October 2011, about 16 days before the start of the inaugural Australian version of the festival, organisers announced that the festival would move from the widely advertised Bluescope Field near Wollongong to the Hordern Pavilion in Sydney's Moore Park. This decision was made due to heavy rains which were likely to cause major problems. This decision, which may have been justifiable due to the nature of the field, was widely criticised through their official Facebook Page and local newspapers. Organisers stated that "the main reason this event will not take place in Wollongong is due to safety fears over the site. We have walked the site again yesterday (12 October 2011) and feel we had no choice in moving, the rain is forecast for the next few weeks and the site would only become more unsafe. Regarding refunds we thought long and hard about what we do...cancel or continue.....after looking at ticket sales we realized that the majority of tickets sold are from Sydney and on that basis the event had to be moved to the majority ticket holders area."

2012 expansion
The 2011 festival was a "test event" to see its popularity in Australia. If proven successful, the festival would have expanded to three other Australian states in 2012 to become a festival tour like Big Day Out etc. Festival organisers hinted through their official Facebook Page that Melbourne and Brisbane would be a part of the 2012 Festival Tour. A third festival state was still to be announced.

See also
List of Australian music festivals

External links
Rewind 80s Festival Australia 2011 official Twitter feed

Music festivals in Australia